Oktyabrsky District is an administrative and municipal district (raion), one of the twenty-four in Kostroma Oblast, Russia. It is located in the east of the oblast. Its administrative center is the rural locality (a selo) of Bogovarovo. Population:  6,289 (2002 Census);  The population of Bogovarovo accounts for 45.1% of the district's total population.

References

Notes

Sources

Districts of Kostroma Oblast